The year 1994 is the 6th year in the history of Shooto, a mixed martial arts promotion based in the Japan. In 1994 Shooto held 6 events beginning with, Shooto: Shooto.

Title fights

Events list

Shooto: Shooto

Shooto: Shooto was an event held on January 14, 1994, at Korakuen Hall in Tokyo, Japan.

Results

Shooto: New Stage Battle of Wrestling

Shooto: New Stage Battle of Wrestling was an event held on March 11, 1994, at Korakuen Hall in Tokyo, Japan.

Results

Shooto: Shooto

Shooto: Shooto was an event held on March 18, 1994, at Korakuen Hall in Tokyo, Japan.

Results

Shooto: Shooto

Shooto: Shooto was an event held on May 6, 1994, at Korakuen Hall in Tokyo, Japan.

Results

Shooto: Vale Tudo Access 1

Shooto: Vale Tudo Access 1 was an event held on September 26, 1994, at Korakuen Hall in Tokyo, Japan.

Results

Shooto: Vale Tudo Access 2

Shooto: Vale Tudo Access 2 was an event held on November 7, 1994, at Korakuen Hall in Tokyo, Japan.

Results

See also 
 Shooto
 List of Shooto champions
 List of Shooto Events

References

Shooto events
1994 in mixed martial arts